The Caspian goby (Neogobius caspius) is a species of fish endemic to the Caspian Sea where it is only found in brackish waters.

References 

Fish described in 1831
Fish of the Caspian Sea
Endemic fauna of the Caspian Sea
Brackish water organisms
Neogobius
Fish of Western Asia